Mary Livermore Norris Barrows (June 30, 1877March 1, 1955) was an American politician. She represented Melrose in the Massachusetts House of Representatives.

Early life and education 
Born on June 30, 1877, to Oscar and Henrietta White (Livermore) Norris in Melrose, Massachusetts. Barrows was a granddaughter of Mary Livermore. She graduated from Wellesley College, where she was a member of the College Equal Suffrage League. On July 1, 1901, she married Malcolm Dana Barrows, brother of Alice Barrows. They had two sons, Malcolm Jr. and John.

Political career 
Before entering the Massachusetts House, Barrows was a member of the Melrose board of aldermen. She was first elected as an alderwoman in 1926, becoming Melrose's first alderwoman.

Barrows was first elected to the Massachusetts House in 1928, and was the first woman to represent Melrose. She retired from the House in 1938.

Barrows was a Republican.

Barrows died on March 1, 1955, in Melrose Hospital.

See also
 Massachusetts legislature: 1929–1930, 1931–1932, 1933–1934, 1935–1936, 1937–1938

References 

1877 births
1955 deaths
20th-century American women politicians
Republican Party members of the Massachusetts House of Representatives
Wellesley College alumni
20th-century American politicians
People from Melrose, Massachusetts